Lukas Katenda is an ordained Anglican minister, and bishop of the Reformed Evangelical Anglican Church of Namibia (REACH-Namibia). He is an energetic pastor and preacher of the Gospel seeking the reformation and transformation of the Namibian Nation and beyond.   He was born and raised in Onamutai village. On the 6th October 2019, Rev. Lukas Kaluwapa Katenda was ordained as the Second Bishop of the Reformed Evangelical Anglican Church (REACH) in Namibia. He was consecrated by Bishops Glenn Lyons (Presiding Bishop), Njabulo Mazibuko (Area Bishop of KwaZulu-Natal) and Alan Noble (Area Bishop of Western Cape and Free State).

Education 
Lukas Katenda is a registered nurse by profession, and he holds a Diploma in Comprehensive Nursing Sciences from the University of Namibia. He also holds a Masters in Theological Studies from Virginia Theological Seminary in Alexandria, United States of America. He also holds a Diploma in Theology and Ministry from Theological Education by Extension College frominth Africa.

Public theology 
Lukas Katenda is a cleric who is active in addressing issues affecting society in Namibia, ranging from politics to moral rights, etc. Amongst those issues were the protection of children, healthy marriages, injustice in the society, discrimination, corruption, etc.

References 

Living people
Namibian Anglican bishops
University of Namibia alumni
Virginia Theological Seminary alumni
Year of birth missing (living people)